Donald George Bloesch (1928–2010) was an American evangelical theologian. For more than 40 years, he published scholarly yet accessible works that generally defend traditional Protestant beliefs and practices while seeking to remain in the mainstream of modern Protestant theological thought. His seven-volume Christian Foundations series has brought him recognition as an important American theologian.

He characterized himself a "progressive evangelical" or "ecumenical orthodox" criticizing the excesses of both the theological left and right. He often decried the abandonment of traditional values among liberals, but also the ugly, reactionary habits of some conservatives.

His own denomination, in which he was an ordained minister, was the United Church of Christ (UCC). He was raised in the Evangelical and Reformed Church, now merged with the UCC, in which his father and both his grandfathers were also ordained ministers. The "E and R" was a representative of evangelical pietism, a movement that emphasized personal piety, a discerning, educated laity, a reliance on scripture, and an acceptance of the mystical side of Christianity.

Bloesch's pietistic background and personal spiritual life lay at the heart of understanding his theology and how Christianity is to continue into the future. In his view, much of American Protestantism has entrenched itself into narrow intellectually based definitions of doctrine which omit, exclude and even prohibit the mystical element as the governing element of the faith (i.e., the action of the Holy Spirit). Much of his critique is in fact directed at his own denomination, the United Church of Christ; he worked with a conservative lobbying group, the Biblical Witness Fellowship, to protest against its more liberal theological and ethical streams.

From 1957 until his retirement in 1992, he was a professor of theology at the University of Dubuque Theological Seminary in Dubuque, Iowa, where he continued as a professor emeritus. The seminary's library serves as the repository of his papers.

Born on May 3, 1928, in Bremen, Indiana, he received his undergraduate degree from Elmhurst College in Elmhurst, Illinois. He earned his Bachelor of Divinity (BD) at Chicago Theological Seminary, and his PhD at the University of Chicago. He did postdoctoral work in Europe at Oxford, Basel, and Tübingen. He served as president of the Midwest Division of the American Theological Society.

In 1997, a Festschrift was published in his honor called From East to West: Essays in Honor of Donald G. Bloesch.

He died on August 24, 2010.

Published works
Systematic Theology:
Essentials of Evangelical Theology, Volume 1: God, Authority and Salvation, 1978 
Essentials of Evangelical Theology, Volume 2: Life, Ministry, & Hope, 1984 
Christian Foundations series:
A Theology of Word & Spirit: Authority & Method in Theology, 1992 
God the Almighty: Power, Wisdom, Holiness, Love, 1995 
Jesus Christ: Savior & Lord, 1997 
The Holy Spirit: Works & Gifts, 2000 
The Church: Sacraments, Worship, Ministry, Mission, 2002 
The Last Things: Resurrection, Judgment, Glory, 2004 
Holy Scripture: Revelation, Inspiration & Interpretation 2006  (cloth),  (pbk)
Theological Notebooks:
Theological Notebook: 1960–1964: Spiritual Journals of Donald G. Bloesch, 1989 
Theological Notebook: 1964–1968: Spiritual Journals of Donald G. Bloesch 1991 
Theological Notebook: Volume 3: 1969–1983: The Spiritual Journals of Donald G. Bloesch, 2005 
Centers of Christian Renewal, 1964 
The Christian Life and Salvation, 1967, 1991 
The Christian Witness in a Secular Age: An Evaluation of Nine Contemporary Theologians, 1968, 2002 
Christian Spirituality East & West, 1968 (with co-author Jordan Aumann)
The Crisis of Piety: Essays Towards a Theology of the Christian Life, 1968, 2nd ed., 1988 
The Reform of the Church, 1970, 1998 
The Ground of Certainty: Toward an Evangelical Theology of Revelation 1971, 2002 
The Evangelical Renaissance, 1973 
Wellsprings of Renewal: Promise in Christian Communal Life, 1974 
Light a Fire: Gospel Songs for Today, 1975
Jesus is Victor! Karl Barth's Doctrine of Salvation, 1976 
The Invaded Church, 1977
The Orthodox Evangelicals: Who They Are and What They Are Saying, 1978 (co-editor) 
Life, Ministry, and Hope, 1979 
Faith & Its Counterfeits, 1981, 
Is the Bible Sexist?: Beyond Feminism and Patriarchalism, 1982 
Crumbling Foundations: Death and Rebirth in an Age of Upheaval, 1984 
The Battle for the Trinity: The Debate over Inclusive God-language, 1985  Reprint, 2001 
Freedom for Obedience: Evangelical Ethics in Contemporary Times , 1987 
The Future of Evangelical Christianity: A Call for Unity Amid Diversity, 1988 
The Struggle of Prayer, 1988 
Reinhold Niebuhr's Re-evaluation of the Apologetic Task (unknown date)
"Spirituality Old & New", 2007

Festschriften
Daniel J. Adams, editor, From East to West: Essays in Honor of Donald G. Bloesch, 1997

References

Sources
1996 personal and intellectual biography by colleague Elmer M. Colyer 
Theopedia article
Inter-Varsity Press bio 
The Boston Collaborative Encyclopedia of Modern Western Theology
Elmhurst College distinguished alumni
DTS library, repository for his papers 
Donald G. Bloesch's Obituary in Dubuque's Telegraph Herald
DONALD G. BLOESCH (1928-2010)

1928 births
2010 deaths
20th-century American theologians
20th-century Calvinist and Reformed theologians
21st-century American theologians
21st-century Calvinist and Reformed theologians
American Calvinist and Reformed theologians
American evangelicals
Chicago Theological Seminary alumni
Elmhurst College alumni
Evangelical pastors
People from Dubuque, Iowa
People from Marshall County, Indiana
Systematic theologians
University of Chicago alumni
University of Dubuque